Gregg Miller is an American inventor, who trademarked Neuticles, testicular implants for pets.

Life
Miller was born in Independence, Missouri on April 28, 1953.

He is a graduate of Truman High School and received a Bachelor of Science in Communications from Central Missouri State University in 1976.

Miller began his career as a general assignment reporter for the Tipton Times in Tipton, Missouri. After a year he became managing editor of the Trenton (Missouri) Republican Times. He accepted a city editor position for the Loveland Reporter-Herald and later became Assistant Communications Director at the home office of Western Auto Supply Company in Kansas City.

Miller started an advertising agency in the early 1980s, which led to his interest in consumer product inventions. In 1992, Miller created and patented Neuticles, testicular implants for pets, and created other implantation devices for pets. To date, over 500,000 pairs of Neuticles have been sold in all 50 states and 49 countries worldwide, according to the company's website.

Going Going NUTS! is Miller's book about the invention of Neuticles. He was awarded the Ig Nobel Prize for Medicine in 2005.

Personal life
Miller resides outside Kansas City, Missouri with his English Bulldog named Humphrey.

Works

References

1953 births
Living people
People from Independence, Missouri
University of Central Missouri alumni
American inventors

20th-century American businesspeople